Greenwich Historic District is located in Greenwich Township, Cumberland County, New Jersey, within the community of Greenwich and the neighboring settlement of Othello. The district was added to the National Register of Historic Places on January 20, 1972.

See also
National Register of Historic Places listings in Cumberland County, New Jersey

References

Historic districts on the National Register of Historic Places in New Jersey
Houses on the National Register of Historic Places in New Jersey
Federal architecture in New Jersey
Geography of Cumberland County, New Jersey
National Register of Historic Places in Cumberland County, New Jersey
Houses in Cumberland County, New Jersey
New Jersey Register of Historic Places
Greenwich Township, Cumberland County, New Jersey